Ali Espahbodi is an Iranian economist and politician.

References

1939 births
Living people
People from Mashhad
Freedom Movement of Iran politicians
Iranian economists
Government ministers of Iran